The United States of America will compete at the 2015 World Championships in Athletics from August 22 to August 30 in Beijing, China.  The membership of the team was selected at the 2015 USA Outdoor Track and Field Championships.  However, membership on the team was subject to the athlete achieving a qualification standard.  In addition, champions from the previous World Championships and the 2014 IAAF Diamond League receive an automatic bye.  An automatic entry is also available to an Area Champion, the IAAF definition of an Area essentially being the specified continental areas of the world.   The United States is part of the North American, Central American and Caribbean Athletic Association, which held its championship August 7–9, 2015 in San Jose, Costa Rica where 20 athletes qualified.  The deadline for entries was August 10.  The final team membership as submitted to the IAAF was announced on August 10, 2015.

Medalists 
The following competitors from United States won medals at the Championships

Results

Men
Track and road events

Field events

Combined events – Decathlon

Women 
Track and road events

Field events

Combined events – Heptathlon

References

External links

 Official IAAF competition website
 American team

Nations at the 2015 World Championships in Athletics
World Championships in Athletics
2015